David Yarritu is an American musician and photographer. He was best known for his short stint as a member of the English new wave band ABC in the 1980s. He was featured in several music videos from the band's How to Be a ... Zillionaire! album, including "Be Near Me" (1985).

Yarritu's only credited role in the production of How to Be a ... Zillionaire! was providing spoken passages on some tracks. He and Eden (Fiona Russell Powell) were hired for ABC's Zillionaire! era mainly for their unconventional look onstage and in videos. In Yarritu's case, it was his short stature, shaven head, oversized eyeglasses, and diminutive build. He was the lone American in the band.

Today Yarritu works as a freelance photographer, and is based in New York City. Among his works is a retrospective of Wigstock through the years in a series of Polaroid photographs.

Albums with ABC
How to Be a ... Zillionaire! (1985)

References

External links

American male musicians
American spoken word artists
ABC (band) members
Year of birth missing (living people)
Living people